Vojvodina League was the third level division in the Yugoslav football league system on two occasions, firstly from 1958 to 1962, and secondly from 1968 to 1988, when it was demoted to become the fourth tier of Yugoslav football. The league previously served as the fourth tier from 1964 to 1968.

Seasons

Tier 3

1958–1962

1968–1988

Tier 4

1964–1968

1988–1993

References

3
Defunct third level football leagues in Europe
Defunct fourth level football leagues in Europe